Michal Pavlů (born 17 April 1987) is a Czech professional ice hockey defenceman who currently plays with HC Bílí Tygři Liberec in the Czech Extraliga.

Pavlů previously played for HC Hradec Králové, HC Kladno and HC Benátky nad Jizerou.

References

External links
 

Czech ice hockey defencemen
HC Bílí Tygři Liberec players
Rytíři Kladno players
Living people
1987 births
HC Benátky nad Jizerou players
Telford Tigers players
HC Vlci Jablonec nad Nisou players
Czech expatriate ice hockey people
Expatriate ice hockey players in England
Czech expatriate sportspeople in England